The 1939 Gruppa B was fourth season of the Soviet (second tier) professional football competitions. The second tier competitions were revived after last year merger.

Teams

Relegated
There were 12 teams relegated from the 1938 Gruppa A.
 Stalinets Moscow – 16th place (returning after a season)
 Dinamo Rostov-na-Donu – 18th place (returning after a season)
 Spartak Leningrad – 20th place (returning after a season)
 Zenit Leningrad – 22nd place (debut)
 Pischevik Moscow – 23rd place (debut)
 Krylya Sovetov Moscow – 25th place (debut)
 Burevestnik Moscow – 26th place (debut)
 Selmash Kharkov – 15th place (returning after two seasons, previously as Serp i Molot Kharkov)
 Lokomotiv Kiev – 17th place (debut)
 Spartak Kharkov – 21st place (debut)
 FC Temp Baku – 19th place (returning after a season)
 Lokomotiv Tbilisi – 24th place (debut)

Promoted
 Dinamo Kazan – (returning after a season)
 Torpedo Gorkiy – (debut)
 Osnova Ivanovo – (debut)
 Avangard Leningrad – (debut)
 Dzerzhinets Voroshilovgrad – Champion at Football Championship of the Ukrainian SSR (debut)
 Dinamo Kharkov – (debut, previously withdrew before the 1936 spring competition)
 Sudostroitel Nikolayev – (debut)
 Stal Dnepropetrovsk – (debut)
 Dinamo Batumi – Champion of the Georgian SSR (debut)
 Spartak Yerevan – Champion of the Armenian SSR (debut)
 Spartak Minsk – 3rd place at Football Championship of the Belarusian SSR (debut)

League standings

Top scorers

Number of teams by republics

See also
 1939 Soviet Top League

External links
 1939 Gruppa B. RSSSF

1939
2
Soviet
Soviet